Cheste is a municipality in the comarca of Hoya de Buñol in the Valencian Community, Spain, located 26 km from the capital Valencia.

History 
According to the Valencian historian Escolano, the first settlers of the region of Cheste were members of Iberian tribes belonging to the old Edetania. This view is supported by numerous remains, particularly those of El Castillarejo (Iberian ceramics and spear points from the Bronze Age).

The Cheste hoard, a cache of gold jewellery and silver coins, was discovered in the locality of La Safa in 1864. The presence of Carthaginian coinage issued by the Barcids alongside an early Roman denarius implies the hoard dates to around the time of the Second Punic War.

Sport 
About five kilometers to the east of the town is the "Circuit de Valencia", a motor sport race track which hosts the Valencian Community motorcycle Grand Prix since 1999.

Bordering localities 
Chiva, Gestalgar, Bugarra, Pedralba, Vilamarxant, Riba-roja de Túria, and Loriguilla

References

External links
 Official site
 Photographs
 Cheste on Google Maps
 Cheste from the Valencian Agency of Tourism

Municipalities in the Province of Valencia
Hoya de Buñol